Anne-Marie Jolly-Desodt, (born 8 August 1952), is a French engineer and academic. Also published as Anne-Marie Jolly, she was deputy director of Ensait from 2001 to 2005 and director of the École Polytechnique of the University of Orléans from 2008 to 2012. She received the Irène Joliot-Curie Prize as female scientist of the year in 2004.

Life and work 
Anne-Marie Jolly-Desodt was born in Grenay (Pas-de-Calais), France. At l’Ecole Polytech Lille, she earned her Masters’s Degree in Engineering in 1974, her PhD in 1986 in Process Control and her habilitation in data fusion for man-machine systems and robotics, eco-conception in 1987.

She is a former professor and director at Polytech Orleans, and is vice president of the French engineering school accreditation – CTI. Throughout her career she has worked to promote the place of women engineers and scientists in the workplace, particularly within the French Association of Women Engineers.

She became vice-president of the Commission des Titres d'Ingénieur in July 2014.

Honors and distinctions 

 Irène-Joliot-Curie Prize for encouraging women to pursue scientific careers (2004)
 Knight of the Legion of Honor (2008)
 European Society for Engineering Education (SEFI) Fellowship Award (2019)

Selected publications

References 

  

1952 births
Living people
French engineers
French women engineers
21st-century French engineers
21st-century women engineers
20th-century French engineers
20th-century women engineers